Snow Job may refer to:

 Snowjob, an American colloquialism for a cover-up
 "Snow Job" (Entourage), an episode of the television series Entourage
 Snow Job (film), a 1971 caper film
 Snow Job (G.I. Joe), a fictional character in the G.I. Joe universe
 Snow Job (TV series), a 1983 Canadian sitcom
 Snow Job, a 2009 novel by William Deverell
 "Snow Job", a song by Bruce Haack on his 1981 album BITE